Zaven Andriasian (sometimes transliterated as Andriasyan; ; born March 11, 1989, in Yerevan) is an Armenian chess Grandmaster and former World Junior Chess Champion.

Chess career

He won the 2005 European Youth Chess Championship for under-16 and the 2006 World Junior Chess Championship. The latter victory automatically earned him the title of Grandmaster (GM). In November 2010 he won the Russian Cup Final after defeating Artyom Timofeev in the second game of the final. In January 2012 he came second in the Armenian Chess960 Championship. In December 2012 he shared first with Alexander Kovchan and Sipke Ernst in the Groningen Chess Festival. In 2016 Andriasian won the Armenian Chess Championship.

Books

Notable games
Zaven Andriasian vs Maxim Rodshtein, World Junior Championship 2006, French Defense: Tarrasch Variation, Chistyakov Defense Modern Line (C07), 1-0
Falko Bindrich vs Zaven Andriasian, World Youth Stars 2007, Semi-Slav Defense: Quiet Variation (D30), 0-1

References

External links

Grandmaster Games Database - Zaven Andriasian

1989 births
Living people
Chess grandmasters
Armenian chess players
World Junior Chess Champions
Chess writers
Sportspeople from Yerevan
Universiade medalists in chess
Universiade silver medalists for Armenia
Medalists at the 2013 Summer Universiade